Let Me Entertain You is a daytime variety show presented by Brian Conley and Christine Lampard that aired on BBC Two from 21 August 2006 to 22 June 2007.

Format
The show invites all comers to entertain a studio audience doing anything they like for a cash prize. At any point during their act, a member of the audience can press a button they are given to register their 'displeasure' with the act; when half of the audience have pressed their buttons, the act is stopped. If they get over one minute of attention they get £100, over two minutes wins £200, and if they last three minutes they earn £1000. If the allcomer is under 16, they receive an alternative to cash prizes - usually a showbiz-related treat or an item useful to their career (e.g. a trip to the West End, a musical instrument). The most popular act from each day is entered into a weekly final.

Champions
The series one champion was 13-year-old classical baritone, Matthew Crane, who sang "Nessun Dorma" in the Grand Final in 2006. Matthew was also asked back to sing on the Grand Final of series two, in 2007, as a guest performer.

The series two champion was Lee Lambert, who was also 13 years old at the time, and a singer. In the final he performed "I Am What I Am" in the disco style associated with Gloria Gaynor. Runners-up were David Ashley, a Frank Sinatra-style singer, and Faces of Disco, a comedy dance act who were subsequently semi-finalists in Britain's Got Talent 2009.

Transmissions

External links
 

Matthew Crane Official Website - Series 1 Champion

2006 British television series debuts
2007 British television series endings
BBC Television shows
Television series by All3Media
Television shows shot at Teddington Studios